The 2022 Somerset Council election took place on 5 May 2022. It was the inaugural election of the new unitary authority, Somerset Council, which will replace Somerset County Council on 1 April 2023. All 110 councillors were elected, representing the same divisions as the old county council, but with twice as many councillors representing each. The councillors elected will sit as members of the existing county council until its replacement by the new authority, at which time the same councillors will become members of Somerset Council.

The election coincided with other local elections across the United Kingdom. The county council election was initially due to take place on 6 May 2021, but Robert Jenrick extended the terms of sitting councillors for a year pending a decision as to which unitarisation scheme would be taken forward: the county council had advocated the eventually successful proposal for a single unitary authority, while the district councils supported introducing two unitary councils.

Background

The Conservative governments of Theresa May and Boris Johnson undertook structural changes to local government in England that resulted in several county councils and their district councils being replaced by unitary authorities. Somerset County Council first made plans for unitarisation in 2018. The county council proposed a single unitary authority that would encompass all the districts, while the district councils proposed two unitary authorities representing the east and the west of the county. Robert Jenrick, the minister responsible, approved the plan for a single council.

Before the election, the Somerset County Council was led by an Conservative Party majority.

Election results
The Liberal Democrats won a majority of 61 of the 110 seats, giving them control of the unitary authority from 2023.

Results by division
Sitting district councillors are shown with *, sitting county councillors are shown with †.

Bishops Hull & Taunton West

Blackdown & Neroche

Blackmoor Vale

Brent

Bridgwater East & Bawdrip

Bridgwater North & Central

Bridgwater South

Bridgwater West

-->

Brympton

Burnham on Sea North

Cannington

Castle Cary

Chard North

Chard South

Cheddar

Coker

Comeytrowe & Trull

Crewkerne

Curry Rivel & Langport

Dulverton & Exmoor

Dunster

Frome East

Frome North

Frome West

Glastonbury

Highbridge & Burnham South

Huntspill

Ilminster

King Alfred

Lydeard

Martock

Mendip Central & East

Mendip Hills

Mendip South

Mendip West

Minehead

Monkton & North Curry

North Petherton

Rowbarton & Staplegrove

Shepton Mallet

Somerton

South Petherton & Islemoor

Street

Taunton East

Taunton North

Taunton South

Upper Tone

Watchet & Stogursey

Wellington

Wells

Wincanton & Bruton

Yeovil Central

Yeovil East

Yeovil South

Yeovil West

References

Notes

Somerset County Council elections
Somerset
2020s in Somerset